Drašnice is a tourist locality in southern Dalmatia, Croatia, located between Makarska and Ploče. The population is 339 (2011).

The village lies at the base of the Biokovo mountain, at the Jadranska magistrala, and across the strait is the island of Hvar.

References

External links 
 Official website of Tourist Board of Drasnice
 History of Drasnice @ drasnice.com

Populated places in Split-Dalmatia County